The Federal Reserve Bank of Boston, commonly known as the Boston Fed, is responsible for the First District of the Federal Reserve, which covers New England: Maine, Massachusetts, New Hampshire, Rhode Island, Vermont and all of Connecticut except Fairfield County. The code of the Bank is A1, meaning that dollar bills from this Bank will have the letter A on them. The Boston Fed describes its mission as promoting "growth and financial stability in New England and the nation". The Boston Fed also includes the New England Public Policy Center.

Current Federal Reserve Bank of Boston president is Susan Collins, who is the first Black woman and the first woman of color to lead any of the 12 regional Federal bank branches.
 
Designed by architecture firm Hugh Stubbins & Associates, the tower portion of the building is suspended between two towers on either side. From 1922 to 1977, the bank's headquarters were located at 250 Franklin Street, currently occupied by the Langham Hotel Boston. This building was designated a Boston Landmark by the Boston Landmarks Commission in 1978.

Board of Directors
The following people serve on the board of directors . Terms expire on December 31 of their final year on the board.

Class A

Class B

Class C

Governors and presidents
The position was installed under the title of “Governor” until the Banking Act of 1935 abolished the dual role of governor and agent and created a single leadership role – president.

Image gallery

See also

 Federal Reserve System
 Federal Reserve Districts
 Federal Reserve Branches
 Federal Reserve Act
 Federal Reserve Bank Building (Boston)
 Structure of the Federal Reserve System

References

External links
Boston Fed home page
History of the Boston Fed
Boston Branch
Annual Reports of the Federal Reserve Bank of Boston from 1916 to 1967

Economy of the Northeastern United States
Boston
Landmarks in Financial District, Boston
New England